The Los Colorados Formation is a sedimentary rock formation of the Ischigualasto-Villa Unión Basin, found in the provinces of San Juan and La Rioja in Argentina. The formation dates back to the Norian age of the Late Triassic.

The formation is the uppermost stratigraphic unit of the Agua de la Peña Group, overlying the Lagerstätte of the Ischigualasto Formation. Los Colorados Formation is partly covered by the Cretaceous Cerro Rajado Formation, separated by an unconformity.

The formation is known for its fossils of early dinosaurs, including the coelophysoid Zupaysaurus and the "prosauropods" Coloradisaurus, Lessemsaurus, and Riojasaurus. Magnetostratigraphic analysis suggests that the Los Colorados Formation was deposited between 227 and 213 million years ago.

Description 

The formation gradually overlies the Ischigualasto Formation and is unconformably overlain by the Cretaceous Cerro Rajado Formation. The formation comprises red-colored, fine- to medium-grain–size sandstones together with siltstones and ancillary floodplain mudstones with early calcisol development. The formation was deposited in a fluvial to lacustrine environment.

Fossil content

Anapsids

Synapsids

Eucynodontia

Archosauromorphs

Crocodylomorpha

Dinosaurs
Indeterminate theropod remains present in the Provincia de la Rioja.

{| class="wikitable" align="center"
|-
! colspan="5" align="center" | Dinosaurs of Los Colorados Formation
|-
! Taxa
! Location
! Notes
! Images
|-
|
Genus:
 Coloradisaurus
 C. brevis
| La Rioja Province
| "Skull, adult"
| 
|-
|
Genus:
 Lessemsaurus
 L. sauropoides
| La Rioja Province
| "Partial cervical, dorsal, and sacral vertebrae, adult."
| 
|-
|
Infraorder:
 Prosauropoda
 Indeterminate remains
| La Rioja & San Juan Provinces
| Includes Strenusaurus procerus. "Dorsals, caudals, partial fore- and hindlimb."
| 
|-
|
Genus:
 Powellvenator
 P. podocitus
| Ischigualasto-Villa Unión Basin
| Known from previously undescribed partial hindlimbs
| 
|-
|
Genus:
 Riojasaurus R. incertus| La Rioja Province
| align=center | 
| 
|-
|
Genus:
 Zupaysaurus Z. rougieri| La Rioja Province
| align=center | 
| 
|-
|}

Ichnofossils
 cf. Brachychirotherium sp. Chirotherium sp.Leonardi locality 15 at Fossilworks.org

 See also 
 List of dinosaur-bearing rock formations
 Quebrada del Barro Formation, contemporaneous fossiliferous formation of the Marayel-El Carrizal Basin just southeast of the Ischigualasto-Villa Unión Basin
 Caturrita Formation, contempeoraneous fossiliferous formation of the Paraná Basin, southeastern Brazil
 Chinle Formation, contemporaneous fossiliferous formation of Arizona
 Elliot Formation, contemporaneous fossiliferous formation of the Karoo Basin, South Africa
 Fremouw Formation, contemporaneous fossiliferous formation of Antarctica

 References 

 Bibliography 
 
 
 
 
 
 
  

 Further reading 

 A. B. Arcucci and R. A. Coria. 2003. A new Triassic carnivorous dinosaur from Argentina. Ameghiniana 40(2):217-228
 J. F. Bonaparte. 1999. Evolución de las vértebras presacras en Sauropodomorpha [Evolution of the presacral vertebrae in Sauropodomorpha]. Ameghiniana 36(2):115-187
 J. F. Bonaparte and J. A. Pumares. 1995. Notas sobre el primer craneo de Riojasaurus incertus (Dinosauria, Prosauropoda, Melanorosauridae) del Triasico Superior de La Rioja, Argentina [Notes on the first skull and jaws of Riojasaurus incertus (Dinosauria, Prosauropoda, Melanorosauridae), Late Triassic of La Rioja, Argentina]. Ameghiniana 32(4):341-349
 J. F. Bonaparte. 1981. Descripción de "Fasolasuchus tenax" y su significado en la sistematica y evolución de los thecodontia. Revista del Museo Argentino de Ciencias Naturales "Bernardino Rivadavia" 3(2):55-101
 J. F. Bonaparte. 1978. Coloradia brevis n. g. et n. sp. (Saurischia–Prosauropoda), dinosaurio Plateosauridae de la Formacion Los Colorados, Triasico Superior de La Rioja, Argentina [Coloradia brevis n. g. et n. sp. (Saurischia–Prosauropoda), a plateosaurid from the Upper Triassic Los Colorados Formation of La Rioja, Argentina]. Ameghiniana 15(3-4):327-332
 J. F. Bonaparte. 1971. Los tetrapodos del sector superior de la Formacion Los Colorados, La Rioja, Argentina (Triásico Superior) [The tetrapods of the upper part of the Los Colorados Formation, La Rioja, Argentina (Upper Triassic)]. Opera Lilloana 22:1-183
 J. F. Bonaparte. 1969. Dos nuevas "faunas" de reptiles triasicos de Argentina [Two new reptilian "faunas" of the Argentine Triassic]. Gondwana Stratigraphy (IUGS Symposium, Buenos Aires) 2:283-306
 J. B. Desojo and A. M. Baez. 2007. Cranial morphology of the Late Triassic South American archosaur Neoaetosauroides engaeus: evidence for aetosaurian diversity. Palaeontology 50:267-276
 J. B. Desojo and A. M. Baez. 2005. El esqueleto postcraneano de Neoaetosauroides (Archosauria: Aetosauria) del Triásico Superior del centro-oeste de Argentina. Ameghiniana 42:115-126
 M. D. Ezcurra and C. Apaldetti. 2012. A robust sauropodomorph specimen from the Upper Triassic of Argentina and insights on the diversity of the Los Colorados Formation. Proceedings of the Geologists' Association 123:155-164
 A. G. Martinelli and G. W. Rougier. 2007. On Chaliminia musteloides'' (Eucynodontia: Tritheledontidae) from the Late Triassic of Argentina, and a phylogeny of Ictidosauria. Journal of Vertebrate Paleontology 27:442-460
 G. W. Rougier, M. S. de la Fuente, and A. B. Arcucci. 1995. Late Triassic turtles from South America. Science 268:855-858

 
Geologic formations of Argentina
Late Triassic South America
Triassic Argentina
Norian Stage
Sandstone formations
Mudstone formations
Siltstone formations
Fluvial deposits
Lacustrine deposits
Geology of La Rioja Province, Argentina
Geology of San Juan Province, Argentina